Beharbari is a locality in southern part of Guwahati in India. It neighbours the Lalmati and Lokhra localities. It is near National Highway 6 and is known as a local commercial center.

Etymology
The etymology of locality is derived from two native Kamrupi dialect (of Assamese language) words. 'Behar' is mustard and 'Bari' is enclosed ground with plantation.

See also
 Pan Bazaar
 Paltan Bazaar
 Beltola

References

Neighbourhoods in Guwahati